Cha-U-Kao was a French entertainer who performed at the Moulin Rouge and the Nouveau Cirque  in the 1890s. Her stage name was also the name of a boisterous popular dance, similar to the can-can, which came from the French words "chahut", meaning "noise" and "chaos". She was depicted in a series of paintings by Henri de Toulouse-Lautrec.
Cha-U-Kao soon became one of his favorite models. The artist was fascinated by this woman who dared to choose the classic male profession of clowning and was not afraid to openly declare that she was a lesbian.

Little is known about her life, including her real name, though she was a gymnast before she worked as a Parisian female clown or "clownesse." During her time as a gymnast, Maurice Guilbert photographed her, capturing her younger self that contrasted with Toulouse-Lautrec's later depictions. Her clown performances included a "distinctive black-and-yellow costume with her hair piled up on her head[.]"

Toulouse-Lautrec sometimes sketched Cha-u-Kao with her partner, and these sketches would be included in his portfolio "Elles." It is believed that her partner was Gabrielle the Dancer, another performer and model for Toulouse-Lautrec. In 1979, art historian Naomi Maurer identified Cha-U-Kao in the artist's work as part of an exhibit at the Art Institute of Chicago. (The exhibit ran in the fall of that year.)

References

Further reading 
Galassi, Susan Grace. “The Impressionist Line from Degas to Toulouse-Lautrec: Drawings and Prints from the Clark.” The Frick Collection Members' Magazine, vol. 13, no. 1, 2013, p. 13. Internet Archive.
Stuckey, Charles F., Henri de Toulouse-Lautrec, and Naomi E. Maurer. Toulouse-Lautrec: Paintings. Art Institute of Chicago, 1979.
McNally, Owen. “THE MASTER OF MONTMARTRE.” Hartford Courant, 15 Oct. 1998, pp. 21–23.
Picture of a young Cha-U-Kao when she was a gymnast (fig. 3)

External link

Acrobats
French clowns
French artists' models
French female dancers
Contortionists
French LGBT entertainers
Paintings by Henri de Toulouse-Lautrec
Year of birth missing
Year of death missing
Moulin Rouge
19th-century French women
19th-century circus performers